NGC 6589 is a reflection nebula located in the constellation of Sagittarius, and it was discovered by Truman Safford on August 28, 1867. In August 1905, Edward Barnard listed it as IC 4690.

References

External links 
 

Reflection nebulae
Sagittarius (constellation)
6589
IC objects
18670828
Discoveries by Truman Safford